Formazza is a comune (municipality) in the Province of Verbano-Cusio-Ossola in the Italian region Piedmont, located about  northeast of Turin and about  north of Verbania, on the border with Switzerland.

Formazza borders the following municipalities: Baceno, Bedretto (Switzerland), Bignasco (Switzerland), Binn (Switzerland), Bosco/Gurin (Switzerland), Cavergno (Switzerland), Premia, Reckingen-Gluringen (Switzerland), Ulrichen (Switzerland).

The village was founded by Walser and Walser German is still spoken.

Geography and climate

Its altitude and location directly under the high mountains of the western Alps influences the climate. In fact, there is an average of more than one meter and thirty centimeters of precipitation per year (especially snow). The climate is the type Dfb/Dfc (Köppen climate classification), which means it is a humid continental climate with fresh and short summers (but usually there is no dry season).

Frazioni 
Frazioni, or subdivisions of Formazza (first name in Italian, second name in Walser dialect):
 Antillone / Puneigä
 Brendo / In dä Brendu
 Canza / Früttwald - Früduwald
 Chiesa - Alla Chiesa / Zer Chilchu - Andermatten - An där Mattu - In där Mattu 
 Fondovalle / Stafelwald - Schtaafuwaald
 Foppiano / Untermstalden - Unnerum Schtaldä
 Frua / Uf der Frütt
 Sotto Frua / Unter der Frütt
 Grovella / Gurfelen - Gurfelä
 Morasco / Moraschg
 Ponte - Al Ponte / Zum Steg - Zumstäg - Zumschtäg - Zer Briggu
 Riale / Kehrbäch(i) - Cherbäch
 Valdo / Wald - Waald
 San Michele / Tuffwaald - Tuffalt

People 
 Mario Bacher (b. 1941), ski mountaineer and cross-country skier

References

External links

 Official website

Cities and towns in Piedmont